Christian Moore is a game designer who has worked primarily on role-playing games.

Career
Christian Moore and Owen Seyler were recent college graduates when they were rooming together in 1994. Moore was working on the design of what was at first a set of miniature rules, and formed the game company Last Unicorn Games with Seyler, Greg Ormand, and Bernie Cahill to publish the game. Instead of a miniatures game, Moore's game eventually became a new roleplaying game, Aria: Canticle of the Monomyth (1994), and was the initial fantasy game produced by Last Unicorn. Moore, Seyler, and new employee Ross Isaacs did the initial work on the "Icon" system for the Star Trek: The Next Generation Role-playing Game (1998). Moore was an old friend of Peter Adkison, and when Last Unicorn was having financial troubles, Wizards of the Coast purchased the company in July 2000. Last Unicorn was still led by Moore when Decipher, Inc. purchased Last Unicorn in 2001. Moore aided George Vasilakos and M. Alexander Jurkat with the Buffy the Vampire Slayer Roleplaying Game (2002). Moore and Seyler later worked for Upper Deck.

References

External links
 

Living people
Place of birth missing (living people)
Role-playing game designers
Year of birth missing (living people)